The Cabin, also known as A Night in the Cabin, is a 2018 Swedish-American horror thriller film directed by Johan Bodell in his feature film debut, written by Erik Kammerland and produced by Bodell and Alec Trachtenberg. The film stars Christopher Lee Page, Caitlin Crommett, Kammerland and Thomas Hedengran. It was released through video on demand platforms.

Plot 
Americans Harry and Rose are in a bad relationship where they can't stop arguing. They head to rural Sweden to a cabin that is situated on a small island in the middle of a lake, a place where Harry's family had frequented for retreats. However, they are unaware that it has become the hangout for a serial-killing axe murderer named Sven.

Cast 

 Christopher Lee Page as Harry
 Caitlin Crommett as Rose
 Erik Kammerland as Sven
 Thomas Hedengran as Thomas

Production 
Filmmaker Johan Bodell and screenwriter Erik Kammerland conceived of the film where they wanted to do something with a few actors and a few locations. They used Bodell's family property near Kilafors, Sweden; his grandfather had built the cabin in the 1960's on the farm area that his aunt currently owns.

Funding for the project began on Kickstarter. The script was written by actor Erik Kammerland while the film was produced by Alec Trachtenberg. Production companies include Coast ART Productions and KW Studios. It was originally titled A Night in the Cabin, but was retitled to The Cabin when it was distributed for the U.S. It was planned to have American actors star in the film.

Release 
The film released for purchase and rent on video on demand and DVD on December 4, 2018 and was distributed by High Octane Pictures.

Critical reception 
Michael Therkelsen of the Horror Society website scored it 7.5 out of 10, stating that the "palpable mood does a lot more for the senses than a Hollywood blockbuster." Todd Martin of HorrorNews.net found the movie to be more of a thriller than a horror film; liked the acting from the main cast, and wished there were some more minor characters as fodder for the killer's body count. Anna Ace of the website PopHorror said the script could be better but it captures the "look and feel of great horror film." Norman Gidney of Film Threat wrote that it had the "potential to be a creepy Rear Window meets Cape Fear" scoring it 5 out of 10.

References

External links 

 
 
 

2018 horror films
2018 horror thriller films
Swedish horror thriller films
American horror thriller films
Swedish slasher films
American slasher films
2010s slasher films
American serial killer films
Films set in Sweden
Films shot in Sweden
Films about couples
Films set in forests
Kickstarter-funded films
2018 direct-to-video films
2018 directorial debut films
Films set on lakes
Squatting in film
Films set on islands
2018 thriller films
Films about vacationing